The 2011 ATP Salzburg Indoors was a professional tennis tournament played on hard courts. It was the third edition of the tournament which is part of the Tretorn SERIE+ of the 2011 ATP Challenger Tour. It took place in Salzburg, Austria between 14 and 20 November 2011.

ATP entrants

Seeds

 1 Rankings are as of November 7, 2011.

Other entrants
The following players received wildcards into the singles main draw:
  Martin Fischer
  Thomas Muster
  Maximilian Neuchrist
  Dominic Thiem

The following players received entry as a special exempt into the singles main draw:
  Mischa Zverev

The following players received entry as an alternate into the singles main draw:
  Marius Copil

The following players received entry from the qualifying draw:
  Benjamin Becker
  Dennis Blömke
  Peter Gojowczyk
  Jan-Lennard Struff
  Dino Marcan (Lucky loser)

Champions

Singles

 Benoît Paire def.  Grega Žemlja, 6–7(6–8), 6–4, 6–4

Doubles

 Martin Fischer /  Philipp Oswald def.  Alexander Waske /  Lovro Zovko, 6–3, 3–6, [14–12]

External links
Official Website
ITF Search
ATP official site

ATP Salzburg Indoors
ATP Salzburg Indoors
Hypo